Raffaele Castielli (5 March 1927 – 3 August 2018) was an Italian bishop, ordinary of the Roman Catholic Diocese of Lucera-Troia. He was ordained a priest on 9 July 1950. He was appointed first bishop of the newly merged Diocese of Lucera-Troia on 11 February 1987, receiving his episcopal consecration on 25 March 1989 from Archbishop Salvatore De Giorgi. Castielli retired as bishop on 18 May 1996.

References

External links
Profile of Mons. Castielli www.catholic-hierarchy.org
Profile of Mons. Castielli www.gcatholic.org

1927 births
2018 deaths
20th-century Italian Roman Catholic bishops
People from the Province of Foggia